Uninvited is a 1999 Italian thriller film directed by Carlo Gabriel Nero, and starring Vanessa Redgrave and Franco Nero. It premiered at the Mar del Plata Film Festival in Argentina on 26 November 1999 before its release in Italy on 19 May 2000.

Plot
Tony has lusted after Patricia his whole life, ever since high school his yearning never ceased, but he was only ever to appreciate her from a distance. Tony becomes a victim of his own heart when he is named chief suspect to the murder of Patricia, her husband and her children. As Tony is incarcerated his lawyer, Barolo struggles to make a case of defence. Meanwhile, Tony struggles to come to terms with Patricia's death.

Cast
Vanessa Redgrave as Mrs. Ruttenburn
Franco Nero as Avvocato Ralph Barolo
Eli Wallach as Strasser
Adam Hann-Byrd as Young Tony Grasso
Kevin Isola as Tony Grasso
Bethel Leslie as Mrs. Wentworth
Stephen Mendillo as Vincent Grasso
Patricia Dunnock as Rose Grasso
Olivia Birkelund as Patricia Macchiato Carver
Barton Tinapp as Kirk Carver
Jessica Munch as Young Patricia
Jennifer Wiltsie as Charlotte Celeste Hinney
Nick Sandow as Ed
Tommy J. Michaels as Koosh

References

External links
 
 

1999 films
English-language Italian films
1990s thriller films
Films based on American novels
Films scored by Carlo Siliotto
1990s English-language films
1990s Italian films